Sarlahi (Maithili: सर्लाही), a part of Madhesh Province, is one of the seventy-seven districts of Nepal.

It is bordered to the west by the Bagmati River, to the east by Mahottari District, to the north by the Sivalik Hills, and to the south by Bihar State of India.

Etymology 
Generally, the people of Sarlahi believe that the name Sarlahi comes from the name of the Sarla Devi temple. The Sarla Devi temple is situated in Hempur village in the Sarlahi district. There is a belief that if someone goes to the temple at night with a light, then that person will die. For that reason, people still do not go at night to that temple with light. There are no residences around this temple.

Famous for
The district is known for a couple of things. One of them is tomato production and supply. Lalbandi is the place of this district which is known for supplying the tomato demand of the whole country. Scientific tomato farming was practiced in Sarlahi district at Bagwani Kendra Nawalpur, Netragunj. Lalbandi is the most famous for growing tomatoes in the country. It is also known as the tomato capital of Nepal. Farhadwa is the village which is famous for fish production and export. The production of sugarcane is also seems to be significant in the district. The Indushankr Chini Udhog Ltd. (Indushankr Sugar Mills) is a notable factory in the district.

The Annapurna Sugars and General Industries Pvt Ltd. is probably one of the largest sugar mills in the country, located in Dhankaul VDC of Sarlahi. The plant commenced trial operations on January 17, 2014, with a successful crushing of over 16 lakh quintals of cane. The mill will substantially help in meeting sugar requirements of the local Nepal market by producing around 300,000 quintals of white sugar. The mill is equipped with modern machinery to produce high-quality sugar. It helps to support the livelihood of thousands of people including farmers, employees and laborers.

The historical Nunthar Pahad is famous among different religious groups because of its typical geographical location. It is located in a strategic place bordering four districts: Makawanpur, Sarlahi, Rautahat and Sindhuli. World Heritage the Mukteshwar Nath historical temple is the best known religious place here which was located in Murtiya village of Sarlahi district. The Nadiman lake, an important Puranic place, is located nearby Malangawa which is believed to be the yaksha pool (kunda), the mystic lake owned by the yaksha himself. The Pattharkot temple is also the best known religious place here. The Sitlamai temple, Bajrangbali temple, Durga temple, Gadhimai temple and Laxmipur Pokhari in Balara Municipality. The Sagaranatha temple in Iswarpur, the Gopalkuti Mahadev temple in Karmaiya, among many others, are equally significant places in Sarlahi. The famous Barahathawa Bazaar is also located here, which is growing as a commercial hub of the district.

Geography and climate

Geographical division
According to geographical texture Sarlahi district is divided into three parts.
 Chure mountain of north
 Bhanwar region of middle
 Terai region of south

Chure mountain
On the north side of the district from east to west is the mountain range known as the Sivalik Hills. This range separates the Terai from the inner Terai and harbours the fossilised remains of many mammals no longer typical of Eurasia.

Bhanwar region
This region is between what is north of the Sivalik hills and the southern Terai region. In the local language, it is also known as char koshe jhadi and thethi. The Mahendra Highway touches this area, so settlement is increasing. In the region, the water source level is always very low; even the following water disappears because of sandiness. It is very difficult to obtain water by digging. Irrigation is problematic in the area.

Terai region
The Terai region begins in the middle of the district to the south and goes to India's Bihar. Since ancient times, the region has had large public density and is a good place for farming, so it is called Treasurer of grain.

Rivers
There are four major rivers in this district that flow into India: the Bagmati, the Hardi (Banke), the Lakhandei and the Jhim. However, there are around a dozen other small rivulets that originate from the Chure hills and flow down the plain. They are actually the tributaries of the three major river systems of the district. These small rivulets are the Hariwan khola, the Dhungre khola, the Soti khola, the Sotraha khola, the Chapini khola, the Pathlaiya khola,  he Kalinjor khola, the Phooljor khola and the Banke Khola. The Banke Khola is the eastern demarcation of the district separating it from Mahottari district, whereas the Bagmati river flows between Sarlahi and Rautahat districts.
Bagmati river system: it is the largest river, flowing in the western side of district separating Rautahat district from Sarlahi.
Lakhandei river system: this river is the largest river inside the district; it is about 25 kilometers long. It originates from the Chure Mountain range, the lowest foothills of the Great Himalayan ranges.  It flows into India by touching Simara village development committee (VDC) of this district.
Jhim river system: originating from the northeast side of the Chure mountains of this district into the Phuljor and Kalinjor rivers, it joins at the Vairawpur village of Jabdi VDC, then it becomes Jhim river. Adhwara river was the east border of Makwanpur region.
Banke (Hardi Nadi) river. Banke river was the east border of Sarlhi district. There are also many rivers in this district including the Adhwara River of the east which empties into the Jhim River, Manushmara river (which is formed by mixing Harion, Sotara and Pathlaiya rivers), and in middle of the district Dhangra and Bhumi rivers.

Bhatauliya river system: this river is the largest river inside the district; it is about 25 kilometers long. It originates from the Soram range, the lowest foothills of the Great Himalayan ranges. It flows into India by touching Bhatauliya VDC of this district.

Demographics
At the time of the 2011 Nepal census, Sarlahi District had a population of 769,729. Of these, 49.0% spoke Bajjika, 21.3% Maithili, 11.8% Nepali, 6.3% Urdu, 4.8% Tamang, 2.1% Tharu, 1.4% Magar, 0.9% Bhojpuri, 0.5% Danuwar, 0.4% Newar, 0.3% Hindi, 0.2% Majhi, 0.1% Awadhi, 0.1% Baitadeli, 0.1% Magahi, 0.1% Rai, 0.1% Sunuwar and 0.1% other languages as their first language.

In terms of ethnicity/caste, 15.5% were Yadav, 7.9% Koiri/Kushwaha, 7.9% Musalman, 5.4% Teli, 5.2% Tamang, 3.7% Chhetri, 3.7% Dusadh/Paswan/Pasi, 3.6% Hill Brahmin, 3.6% Chamar/Harijan/Ram, 2.8% Tharu, 2.7% Mallaha, 2.6% Kalwar, 2.2% Kathabaniyan, 2.2% Kurmi, 2.0% Magar, 1.9% Terai Brahmin, 1.8% Musahar, 1.7% Lohar, 1.6% Dhanuk, 1.4% Kumhar, 1.3% Dhobi, 1.3% Hajam/Thakur, 1.3% Kanu, 1.2% Bin, 1.2% Nuniya, 1.2% Tatma/Tatwa, 1.1% Danuwar, 1.1% Sonar, 1.0% Newar, 1.0% Sudhi, 0.9% Kami, 0.9% Khatwe, 0.8% Rajput, 0.7% Baraee, 0.6% Majhi, 0.5% Halwai, 0.5% Kewat, 0.4% Kayastha, 0.4% Sanyasi/Dasnami, 0.3% Damai/Dholi, 0.3% Gharti/Bhujel, 0.3% Marwadi, 0.2% Dhunia, 0.2% Mali, 0.2% Rai, 0.2% Sarki, 0.2% other Terai, 0.1% Badhaee, 0.1% Bote, 0.1% Dom, 0.1% Gaderi/Bhedihar, 0.1% Kahar, 0.1% Kumal, 0.1% Punjabi/Sikh, 0.1% Sunuwar, 0.1% Thakuri and 0.2% others.

In terms of religion, 85.6% were Hindu, 7.9% Muslim, 5.7% Buddhist, 0.3% Prakriti, 0.2% Christian and 0.3% others.

In terms of literacy, 46.3% could read and write, 2.8% could only read and 50.8% could neither read nor write.

Media 
From Sarlahi district, newspapers and FM radio stations are as follows:

Newspapers: Paricharcha, Madhesh Post Daily, Suchna Saugat Weekly, Sarlahi Awaz Weekly, and Sarlahi Times Weekly.

Sarlahi constituencies
There are a total of four electoral consttituncies for Hosur of Representatives and eight for Provincial assembly which are as below.

 Sarlahi 1
 Sarlahi 2
 Sarlahi 3
 Sarlahi 4

Administration 
The district consists of twenty municipalities, out of which eleven are urban municipalities and nine are rural municipalities. These are as follows:

 Bagmati Municipality
 Balara Municipality
 Barahathwa Municipality
 Godaita Municipality
 Harion Municipality
 Haripur Municipality
 Haripurwa Municipality
 Ishworpur Municipality
 Kabilasi Municipality
 Lalbandi Municipality
 Malangwa Municipality
 Basbariya Rural Municipality
 Bishnu Rural Municipality
 Brahampuri Rural Municipality
 Chakraghatta Rural Municipality
 Chandranagar Rural Municipality
 Dhankaul Rural Municipality
 Kaudena Rural Municipality
 Parsa Rural Municipality
 Ramnagar Rural Municipality

Former Village Development Committees (VDCs)

Achalgadh
Arnaha
Aurahi
Babarganj
Bagmati Municipality,Karmaiya,Sarlahi
Bagdaha
Bahadurpur
Balara
Bara Udhoran
Barahathawa
Basantapur
Batraul
Bela
Belhi
Belwajabdi
Bhadsar
Bhagawatipur
Bhaktipur
Bhawanipur
Brahmapuri
Chandranagar
Chhataul
Chhatona
Dhankaul Pachhawari
Dhanakaul Purba
Dhangada
Ghurkauli
Dhungrekhola
Dumariya
Gadahiyabairi
Gamhariya
Godeta
Gaurishankar
Hajariya
Harakthawa
Haripur
Haripurwa
Hariwan Municipality
Hathiyol
Hempur
Ishwarpur
Jabdi
Jamuniya
Janaki Nagar
Jingadawa
Kabilasi
Kalinjor
Karmaihiya
Khairwa
Khoriya
Kisanpur
Kaudena
Lalbandi
Laukat
Laksmipur Kodraha
Laksmipur Su.
Madhubangoth
Mahinathpur
Mailhi
Malangawa Municipality
Manpur
Masaili
Mirjapur
Mohanpur
Motipur
Murtiya
Musauli
Narayan Khola
Narayanpur
Netraganj
Naukailawa
Parsa
Parwanipur
Pattharkot
Pharahadawa
Phulparasi
Pidari
Pidariya
Pipariya
Rajghat
Ramnagar Bahuarwa
Ranban
Raniganj
Rohuwa
Sakraul
Salempur
Sangrampur
Sankarpur
Shahorwa
Shreepur
Sikhauna
Simara
Sisautiya, Manharwa, Madhopur
Sisaut
Shankarpur
Sohadawa
Sudama
Sundarpur
Piprabhitta, Sundarpur Choharwa
Tribhuwannagar

Notable people 

 Sambhu Lal Shrestha, Nepali Congress leader and former Minister for Agriculture of Nepal
 Jangi Lal Ray, Nepali Congress leader and former member of Constituent Assembly
 Amresh Kumar Singh, Nepali Congress leader and member of House of Representatives
Rajendra Mahato, Sadbhawana party politician and former minister who left district for election purpose after unsuccessful attempts in general elections
 Mahendra Raya Yadav, member of House of Representatives and Minister for Agriculture of Nepal 
Pramod Sah, member of House of Representatives
Birendra Prasad Singh, Nepali Congress leader, member of Provincial Assembly and Minister in Government of Madhesh Province.

See also
Zones of Nepal

References

External links

 
Districts of Nepal established during Rana regime or before
Districts of Madhesh Province